A. pedunculata may refer to:
 Azorella pedunculata, a member of the genus Azorella
 Acronychia pedunculata, a large shrub or small tree found in Asian tropical forests
 Aeginetia pedunculata, a member of the genus Aeginetia in the family Orobanchaceae